Charles Dugas (22 October 1885, in Alès – 4 October 1957, in Montpellier) was a 20th-century French archaeologist, specialized in the study of pottery of ancient Greece, a member of the French School at Athens and dean of the Faculté des lettres de Lyon.

Published works 
Charles Dugas published numerous articles, available in the archives of the Faculty of Arts of Lyon, and those of the French School at Athens. He also wrote many books, some of which are still published today:

1911: Les fouilles de Tégée (1910), Paris, Alphonse Picard et Fils
1919: Les étapes de la crise grecque, 1915-1918, Paris, Bossard, (under the pseudonym Charles Frégier)
1924: La Céramique grecque, Payot, Paris
1924: Le Sanctuaire d'Aléa Athéna à Tégée au IVe siècle, Paris, Geuthner
1925: La Céramique des Cyclades, De Boccard
1923: Classification des céramiques antiques : céramiques Lacono-Cyrenéennes, Mâcon, Impr. de Protat frères
1930: Aison et la peinture céramique à Athènes à l'époque de Périclès
1930: Le Trésor de céramique de Délos, De Boccard
1958: Thésée, images et récits, with Robert Flacelière 
1960: Recueil Charles Dugas, De Boccard, (posthumous)

He participated in the collection of excavations entitled Exploration Archéologique de Délos of the French School at Athens, first published by De Boccard. He is the author of:
1928: volume 10 : Les Vases de l'Héraion
1934: volume 15 : Les vases préhelléniques et géométriques
1935: volume 17 : Les vases orientalisants de style non mélien
1952: volume 21 : Les vases attiques à figures rouges.

There is a collection of his articles, produced by the Société des amis de la Bibliothèque Salomon Reinach under the leadership of Henri Metzger in his honor and published in 1961:
 Fasc. I. Recueil Charles Dugas, Diffusion De Boccard

See also 
 Pottery of ancient Greece
 French School at Athens

References 

1885 births
People from Alès
1957 deaths
French archaeologists
Members of the Académie des Inscriptions et Belles-Lettres
École Normale Supérieure alumni
Lycée Henri-IV alumni
Members of the French School at Athens
French hellenists
20th-century archaeologists